Subregions of Hungary (in Hungarian, sing. ) were subdivisions of Hungary, dividing the twenty counties of Hungary (including Budapest) into 175 administrative subregions. The subregions were abolished and replaced by 198 districts in 2013.

List
The subregions are listed below, by county:

See also 
 Regions of Hungary
 Counties of Hungary
 Districts of Hungary (from 2013)
 Subregions of Hungary (until 2013)
 Administrative divisions of the Kingdom of Hungary (until 1918)
 Counties of the Kingdom of Hungary
 Administrative divisions of the Kingdom of Hungary (1941–44)
 List of cities and towns of Hungary
 NUTS:HU

 
Subdivisions of Hungary
Hungary, Subregions
Sub-regions, Hungary
Hungary geography-related lists